Humble Politician Nograj is an Indian Kannada-language political satire comedy series created and produced by Danish Sait, Saad Khan and it premiered on Voot. It is a sequel to the 2018 film Humble Politician Nograj. Danish Sait reprise the role of Nograj, narcissistic politician who aspire to become Chief minister and make money through corruption. Series is the joint venture of Applause Entertainment, Danish Sait and Firstaction Studios. The first season was inspired by true events.

Synopsis
After become an MLA, Nograj made a lot of money through corruption and became the state president of One Big Party (OBP) and had goal is to become the Chief Minister of Karnataka. In general assembly election no party got majority seats to form government. One Big Party, which has won 36 seats. Krishna Gundu Bala (KGB) State president of Most Secular Party(MSP) is three votes short of getting the majority. Nograj decides to form a Coalition government by joining hands with Family Run Party, which is headed by a clueless son and his firangi mom. Horse-trading of MLAs happen, so does resort politics. Who will become the Chief Minister of Karnataka when some mafia enters in play?.

Cast 
 Danish Sait as Humble Politiciann Nograj, state president of One Big Party("OBP") who aspire to become CM
 Prakash Belawadi as Krishna Gundu "KGB" Bala, state president of Most Secular Party("MSP") and become the state CM without full majority 
 Vijay Chendoor as Monjunath, Nograj's personal assistant
 Disha Madan as Simi Naveen, Paid News TV reports and anchor
 Sal Yusuf as Dimitri, Russian mafia 
 Shalini Narayan as Gowri, KGB wife
 Raghu Ramankoppa as Gurudas Bhat, the secretary of OBP
 Shiv Manju as Nanjundaiah, MLA of OBP and friend of Nograj
 Mohammed Ashraf as Azam Khan, a Muslim MLA from OBP and Nograj's friend
 Varun Thakur as Karan Kapoor, National president of Family Run Party("FRP")
 Geetanjali Kulkarni as Mrs. Dalal, National secretary of MSP
 Anantha Velu as Governor Govardhan
 Tiku Talsania as PM Sahab 
 Shivakumar Aradhya as Pushpesh,  state President of FRP
 Sathish Chandra as MLA Shashidhar
 Mahantesh Hiremath as MLA Manjay 
 Andrea Ravera as Vladimir, brother of Dimitri
 Srivatsa as Ram Rehman, KGB son

Episodes

Productions
Initially Nogaraj is character created by Danish Sait for his radio program and it gain popularity among the city folks and decide to make full-length feature film with his friend Saad Khan. After the success of film Humble Politiciann Nograj, Danish Sait interested on making web-series on same name. Sameer Nair of Applause Entertainment finances this venture.

Saad Khan wanted to spin-off film and webseries based on Nograj film character. Script writing started in July 2019 with Danish and team, after progressing the script decided to make webseries due to length of the story and writing.

Shooting began 10 January 2020 onwards and Saad Khan directed the all 10 episodes. Most of the shooting done in Mysore outskirts. Shooting stop for some time due to Corona 19 pandemic.

Music

Track list

Release
Series teaser released on 17 December 2021 by Danish Sait via his Twitter account. Announces series will releases on 06 January 2022 in Voot Select

The ten episode first season premiered on 6 January 2022 on Voot. Hindi dubbed version made available on same time.

Reception
Critics praise the satirical slapstick comedy,  Dialogue, Characterisation, acting but criticize on length of episodes.

India Today wrote review "Saad Khan and Danish Sait, who penned the story, made fun of every topic. From homophobia to body shaming to racism, you'll find a joke on everything.The series does not shy away from showing how the politicians exploit the system and the audience. More importantly, it cleverly takes a jibe at current politicians without using their names. No points for guessing who’s who"

Awards and nominations

References

External links
 

2022 Indian television series debuts
Indian drama web series